XHSM-FM is a radio station in Ciudad Obregón, Sonora. Broadcasting on 100.9 FM, XHSM is owned by Grupo AS Comunicacion and carries a grupera format known as La Poderosa.

History
XHSM received its concession on November 28, 1988. It was owned by Sociedad de Radiodifusión y Televisión, S.A., a subsidiary of Radiorama.

Control of the station passed to Larsa when Radiorama largely exited the state of Sonora.

In August 2019, XHSM went silent as Larsa ceased its own operations in Ciudad Obregón, affecting three stations. In November, Radiorama took over direct operation of XHIQ and XHSM-FM 100.9, with XHSM flipping to grupera as La Poderosa.

References

Radio stations in Sonora